William, Bill, Billy, or Willie Riley may refer to:

Sports
William Riley (Nottinghamshire cricketer) (1888–1917)
William Riley (Leicestershire cricketer) (1892–1955)
Bill Riley (ice hockey, born 1921) (1921–2000), American ice hockey player
Bill Riley (ice hockey, born 1950), Canadian ice hockey player
Bill Riley Jr., American ice hockey player and coach
Billy Riley (1889–1977), wrestler
Billy Riley (baseball) (1855–1887), outfielder in Major League Baseball

Arts and entertainment
Willie Riley (1866–1961), British author
William K. Riley, one of the pen names of British author John Creasey (1908–1973)
Bill Riley Sr. (1920–2006), American entertainer
Billy Lee Riley (1933–2009), American musician

Other
William Riley (architect) (1852–1937), British architect
William J. Riley (born 1947), United States federal judge
William F. Riley (judge) (1884–1956), United States federal judge
William F. Riley (engineer), American engineer and professor
William Harrison Riley (1835–1907), British socialist
William Bell Riley (1861–1947), American religious leader
William Riley (criminal), a.k.a. "Mush" Riley, American saloon keeper and underworld figure
William E. Riley (1897–1970), American general

See also
Riley (surname)
William O'Reilly (disambiguation)